Peck's Bad Boy is a 1921 American silent comedy film directed by Sam Wood and starring Jackie Coogan, Wheeler Oakman, Doris May, Raymond Hatton, James Corrigan, and Lillian Leighton. It is based on the series of books by George W. Peck. The film was released by Associated First National Pictures on April 24, 1921.

Cast
Jackie Coogan as Henry Peck AKA 'Peck's Bad Boy'
Wheeler Oakman as Dr. Jack Martin - the Man in the Case
Doris May as Letty Peck - Henry's Sister
Raymond Hatton as The Village Grocer
James Corrigan as George W. Peck - Henry's Pa
Lillian Leighton as Mrs. George W. Peck - Henry's Ma
Charles Hatton as Buddy - Henry's Pal
K. T. Stevens as Henry's Sweetheart
Dean Riesner
Queenie the Dog as Tar Baby - Henry's Dog
Robert Brower as The Minister (uncredited)

Preservation
Prints of Peck's Bad Boy exists at the George Eastman House, Library of Congress, Museum of Modern Art, EYE Film Institute Netherlands, UCLA Film and Television Archive, and Academy Film Archive.

References

External links

lantern slide

1921 comedy films
First National Pictures films
Silent American comedy films
1921 films
American silent feature films
American black-and-white films
Films based on American novels
Films directed by Sam Wood
1920s American films